The Prince Edward Island Liberal Party (officially the Prince Edward Island Liberal Association) is a political party in the province of Prince Edward Island, Canada. The PEI Liberals are affiliated with the federal Liberal Party of Canada.

History

The party was created when PEI was a British colony by reformers who agitated for the system of responsible government. This was granted by the British crown to the colony in 1851.

George Coles was its dominant figure in its first decades. While initially supportive of Canadian Confederation, Coles and the Liberals soured on the project, and it was not until 1873 that the island joined Canada as a means of relieving the PEI government's severe debts.

The early party supported the abolition of school fees, and a resolution to the "Land Question" that divided the province. The Liberals supported land reform through the state acquisition of large landed estates. These estates were broken up and turned over to tenants and squatters.

The Liberals have been one of only two parties forming government on the island since 1851, the other being the Conservatives. The Liberals have formed government more often, but not in recent times. In practice, there is little to distinguish the two parties from each other: both lean towards the centre of the political spectrum. The Liberals being slightly to the left and the Conservatives (Tories) slightly to the right.

Traditionally, the Tories have done better among Protestant voters, while Liberals have had more support from Catholics. Politics on the island, however, has never been sectarian, and both parties have always had voters and members from both populations. Indeed, it has been the custom until recently for a Liberal incumbent of one denomination to be opposed by a Tory challenger of the same denomination and vice versa. This had tended to minimise religious sectarianism within the parties. The Liberals have also traditionally enjoyed the support of the province's small Acadian population concentrated in Prince County at the west end of the island. Conservative support has tended to be greater on the eastern half of the island.

In the past forty years the most significant figures in the party have been Alexander B. Campbell and, later, Joe Ghiz. Liberal governments in the 1960s and 1970s under Campbell supported diversification of the province's agricultural economy. Government incentives were provided to attract manufacturing and tourism. Under Ghiz in the 1980s, the Liberals opposed free trade between Canada and the United States, and the federal Tory government's decision to close a military base on the island. The party's enthusiasm for economic intervention in the economy had waned since the Campbell years.

Ghiz resigned in 1993 and was succeeded by Catherine Callbeck. Callbeck was the third female premier in Canadian history and, after the 1993 election, the first to lead her party to victory in a general election. After three and a half years, Callbeck resigned and was succeeded by Keith Milligan, under whom the Liberals were defeated in the 1996 election, falling to 8 seats. Wayne Carew was elected leader in 1999, and saw the party's fortunes fall further, winning a single seat in the 2000 election. Robert Ghiz, son of Joe Ghiz, was elected leader in 2003.

After more than ten years in opposition, the Liberals returned to government in the 2007 election, and were re-elected in 2011. Ghiz resigned in 2015 and was succeeded as party leader and premier by Wade MacLauchlan, who lead the Liberals to a third victory in 2015. After twelve years in government, the Liberals were defeated in the 2019 election, and were reduced to third party status for the first time in their history, behind the Progressive Conservatives and the Greens. As the only candidate to seek the leadership, Sharon Cameron was named leader on November 19, 2022.

Current MLAs
 Sonny Gallant, Evangeline-Miscouche
 Robert Henderson, O'Leary-Inverness
 Gord McNeilly, Charlottetown-West Royalty
 Hal Perry, Tignish-Palmer Road

Liberal leaders
George Coles, 1851–1869
Joseph Hensley, 1869
Robert Haythorne, 1869–1876
Louis Henry Davies, 1876–1882
John Yeo, 1882–1891
Frederick Peters, 1891–1897
Alexander Warburton, 1897–1898
Donald Farquharson, 1898–1901
Arthur Peters, 1901–1908
Francis Haszard, 1908–1911
Herbert James Palmer, 1911–1912
John Richards, 1912–1915
John Howatt Bell, 1915–1923
Albert Charles Saunders, 1923–1930
Walter Lea, 1930–1936
Thane Campbell, 1936–1943
John Walter Jones, 1943–1953
Alex W. Matheson, 1953–1965
Lorne Bonnell, 1965 (interim)
Alexander B. Campbell, 1965–1978
Bennett Campbell, 1978 (interim), 1978–1981
Gilbert Clements, 1981 (interim)
Joseph A. Ghiz, 1981–1993
Catherine Callbeck, 1993–1996
Keith Milligan, 1996–1999
Wayne Carew, 1999–2000
Ron MacKinley, 2000–2003 (interim)
Robert Ghiz, 2003–2015
Wade MacLauchlan, 2015–2019
Robert Mitchell, 2019 (interim)
Sonny Gallant, 2019–2022 (interim)
Sharon Cameron, 2022–present

See also
List of Prince Edward Island premiers
List of political parties in Prince Edward Island
Politics of Prince Edward Island
Prince Edward Island Liberal Party leadership elections

References

External links
Prince Edward Island Liberal Party, official website
Young Liberals of PEI

Liberal Party of Canada
Liberal parties in Canada
Organizations based in Charlottetown
Liberal Party
Political parties established in 1851
1851 establishments in Prince Edward Island
Centrist parties in Canada